John Anthony "Tony" Carty is a legal scholar in Hong Kong, where he holds the Sir Y K Pao Chair Professorship of Public Law in the University of Hong Kong. He formerly served as Professor of Public Law in the University of Aberdeen.

Education
He received an LL.B. (Queen's University Belfast in  1968, an LL.M. (University College, London, 1969), and a PhD (Cambridge, 1973)

Career
Carty was Eversheds Professor, University of Derby, 1994-2003, Professor of Law,  University of Westminster 2003-2005, and then Professor of Public Law, University of Aberdeen from January 2006- on. He is also the holder of the Sir Y K Pao Chair of Public Law, University of Hong Kong, from April 2009 to the present.

From 2010 on, he  is the 'Editor in Chief of the  Online Oxford Bibliography of International Law  
 
Carty's research interests focus on international law, including the theory of international law, human rights, the theory of autonomous regions within states, such as Scotland, the Basque Country etc., law and development, law and literature and legal philosophy, especially the history of legal thought.

Publications

Books
Carty, A. and Smith, A. McC. (eds.), Power and Manoeuvrability: The International Implications of an Independent Scotland, Q Press, Edinburgh, 
Carty, A.   Philosophy of International Law, Edinburgh : Edinburgh University Press, 2007. According to WorldCat, the book is held in 808 libraries
Carty, A and R. A.  and Smith, Sir Gerald Fitzmaurice and the World Crisis: A Legal Adviser in the Foreign Office 1932-1945, Kluwer (2000) 
Carty, A., (ed.) Post-modern law : enlightenment, revolution, and the death of man Edinburgh : Edinburgh University Press, ©1990.
Carty, A. and G M Danilenko, eds. Perestroika and international law : current Anglo-Soviet approaches to international law New York : St. Martin's Press, 1990.

Articles
 Independence and the Scottish Political Imagination, in Hearn, Sheila G. (ed.), Cencrastus No. 11, New Year 1983, pp. 26 - 28, 
 Scottish Legal Culture and the Withering Away of the State: A Study in MacCormick's Nationalism, in Hearn, Sheila G.(ed.), Cencrastus No. 14, Autumn 1983, pp. 5 - 9,

References

External links
Oxford Bibliography Website: http://www.oxfordbibliographies.com/page/international-law
University of Aberdeen Website: http://www.abdn.ac.uk/law/people/profiles/a.carty
HKU Webpage: https://web.archive.org/web/20130316123116/http://www.law.hku.hk/faculty/staff/tony_carty.html

Year of birth missing (living people)
Living people
Place of birth missing (living people)
International law scholars
Academics of the University of Aberdeen
Academic staff of the University of Hong Kong
Alumni of Queen's University Belfast
Alumni of University College London
Alumni of the University of Cambridge